Ashkezar County is in Yazd province, Iran. The capital of the county is the city of Ashkezar. At the 2006 census, the county's population was 28,072 in 7,809 households. The following census in 2011 counted 33,192 people in 9,699 households. At the 2016 census, the county's population was 32,566 in 9,613 households, by which time Nadushan Rural District and the city of Nadushan had been separated from the county to join Meybod County.

Administrative divisions

The population history and structural changes of Ashkezar County's administrative divisions over three consecutive censuses are shown in the following table. The latest census shows two districts, two rural districts, and two cities.

References

 

Counties of Yazd Province